Energy Work: The Secret of Healing and Spiritual Development is a book by author Robert Bruce. He delineates his method of vibrational medicine that he refers to as "tactile imaging" that he introduced in his earlier Astral Dynamics and develops it based on ideas from Traditional Chinese medicine and Kriya Yoga.

Editions 

 Hampton Roads Publishing Company  Edition: Paperback; July 1, 2007

References 

2007 non-fiction books
New Age books
Concepts in alternative medicine